The Bezirk Zell am See is an administrative district (Bezirk) in the federal state of Salzburg, Austria, and congruent with the Pinzgau region.

The administrative center of the district is Zell am See. 
It is a two-hour transfer to resort from Salzburg Airport.
The region’s biggest town is Saalfelden with a population of 20,000.

Administrative divisions 
The district is divided into 28 municipalities, three of them are towns, and four of them are market towns.

Towns 
 Saalfelden am Steinernen Meer (15,093)
 Zell am See (9,638)
 Mittersill (5,930)

Market towns 
 Lofer (1,943)
 Neukirchen am Großvenediger (2,616)
 Rauris (3,107)
 Taxenbach (2,918)

Municipalities 
 Bramberg am Wildkogel (3,895)
 Bruck an der Großglocknerstraße (4,430)
 Dienten am Hochkönig (800)
 Fusch an der Großglocknerstraße (754)
 Hollersbach im Pinzgau (1,159)
 Kaprun (2,903)
 Krimml (886)
 Lend (1,604)
 Leogang (3,035)
 Maishofen (3,026)
 Maria Alm (2,143)
 Niedernsill (2,413)
 Piesendorf (3,481)
 Saalbach-Hinterglemm (3,020)
 Sankt Martin bei Lofer (1,151)
 Stuhlfelden (1,539)
 Unken (1,956)
 Uttendorf (2,813)
 Viehhofen (635)
 Wald im Pinzgau (1,176)
 Weißbach bei Lofer (406)

(population numbers May 15, 2001)

Tourist attractions
 Castle Saalhof
 Grossglockner Hochalpenstrasse
 Krimmler Falls
 Pinzgauer Lokalbahn

References

External links

Images of Pinzgau

 
Districts of Salzburg (state)